Agreste Potiguar is a microregion in the Brazilian state of Rio Grande do Norte.

Municipalities 
The microregion consists of the following municipalities:
 Boa Saúde
 Bom Jesus
 Brejinho
 Ielmo Marinho
 Jundiá
 Lagoa d'Anta
 Lagoa de Pedras
 Lagoa Salgada
 Monte Alegre
 Nova Cruz
 Passa e Fica
 Passagem
 Riachuelo
 Santa Maria
 Santo Antônio
 São Paulo do Potengi
 São Pedro
 Senador Elói de Souza
 Serra Caiada
 Serrinha
 Várzea
 Vera Cruz

References

Microregions of Rio Grande do Norte